Shamil Bank of Yemen and Bahrain is an Islamic bank, established as a closed joint stock Yemeni company.

History
The bank was granted a license to do business on February 17, 2002 by the Central Bank of Yemen.

As an Islamic Bank, SBYB’s services are Islamic Sharia compliant. It operates business through 16 branch and office networks which are spread over all the main cities in Yemen. The number of employees in the bank at the end of 2014 was 270.

In September 2018, a branch opened in Marib. In January 2019, the deputy director of the bank was detained for several days by the Houthi forces.

References

External links
Official website

Banks established in 2002
Investment banks